Anne Powell (born 20 November 1973) is an Australian female curler.

Outside of curling she is a rheumatologist and general physician, and also Director of Physician Education at Alfred Health and Director of CCS's (Central Clinical School of Monash University) Medical Education program. She did her undergraduate training at Monash University so she has a lifetime experience of Monash's medical education system.

She started play curling in 2006 when she at the University of Alberta in Canada doing her Research Clinical Fellowship in rheumatology.

Teams and events

Women's

Mixed

Mixed doubles

References

External links
 

Living people
1973 births
Australian female curlers
Australian curling champions